Krondorf is a locality in the Barossa Valley in South Australia. The name of the village is derived from the German for Crown's village.

Prior to 1918, the name of the locality may have been Kronsdorf. In 1918, it was changed to Kabminye (an Australian Aboriginal word for stars) when many Australian placenames were changed to sound less German. An alternate name that was proposed instead of Kabminye was Blennerhassett, in honour of Lady Galway, wife of the Governor of South Australia and daughter of Sir Roland Blennerhassett. It was changed back to Krondorf in 1975.

Krondorf (or Kronsdorf) was first settled in 1847 by Germans from nearby Bethany. The Zum Kripplein Christi Lutheran church was built in 1864 and closed in 1955. The church has been renovated by the owners of Charles Melton Wines, a local winery, to provide bed-and-breakfast accommodation.

References

Towns in South Australia
Barossa Valley